The Wanganui by-election of 1893 was a by-election held on 9 June 1893 during the 11th New Zealand Parliament in the central North Island seat of Wanganui.

The election was held due to death of sitting Member, Prime Minister John Ballance. The contest for his former seat was won by his longtime friend and business partner Archibald Willis, who received support from the constituents by keeping the "Ballance tradition" alive.

Results
The following table gives the election results:

Notes

References

Wanganui 1893
1893 elections in New Zealand
Politics of Manawatū-Whanganui